Hasbeh may refer to:
 Ghadir Habseh
 Hasbeh-i-Kochek